Ethel Franklin Betts Bains (September 6, 1877 – October 9, 1959) was an American illustrator primarily of children's books during the golden age of American illustration in the late 19th and early 20th centuries.

Early life and education
Betts was born in Philadelphia, Pennsylvania on September 6, 1877, the daughter of the physician Thomas Betts and Alice Whelan. She was the younger sister of the illustrator Anna Whelan Betts.  Betts studied at the Pennsylvania Academy of the Fine Arts in Philadelphia, with the noted illustrator Howard Pyle  at  Drexel Institute, now Drexel University, and then at the Howard Pyle School in nearby  Wilmington, Delaware.

Career
Betts first gained work illustrating magazines including St. Nicholas Magazine, McClure's, and Collier's. Beginning in 1904, she was commissioned to illustrate several books including James Whitcomb Riley's The Raggedy Man, While the Heart Beats Young, and Frances Hodgson Burnett's A Little Princess. Betts commercial work declined after her marriage to Edward Bains in 1909, occasionally creating cover art for magazines such as House & Garden, but she continued to exhibit her portfolio. She received a bronze medal for her illustration of The Six Swans at the 1915 Panama–Pacific International Exposition. Along with Jessie Willcox Smith and Sarah Stilwell Weber, Betts was one of the "familiar" magazine and book illustrators in the early 20th century.

Death
Betts died at her home in Philadelphia on October 9, 1959. She was buried at Solebury Friends Cemetery in Solebury, Pennsylvania.

Selected works

1901 -- Captain Ravenshaw, or, The Maid of Cheapside : a Romance of Elizabethan London, Robert Neilson Stephens; L.C. Page & Company
1903 -- Kings & Queens : Being the Poetical Works of Beulah, Belinda, John and David, Florence Wilkinson Evans; McClure, Phillips & Company
1904 -- Babes in Toyland, Glen MacDonough and Anna Alice Chapin; Fox, Duffield and Company
1904 -- The Little Grey House, Marion Ames Taggart; McClure, Phillips & Company
1905 -- A Little Princess : Being the Whole Story of Sara Crewe, Now Told for the First Time, Frances Hodgson Burnett; Charles Scribner's Sons.
1905 -- The Heart of Lady Anne, Agnes Castle and Egerton Castle; F.A. Stokes Co.
1905 -- The True Story of Humpty Dumpty, How He was Rescued by Three Mortal Children in Make Believe Land, Anna Alice Chapin; Dodd, Mead & Co.
1906 -- Mother Goose: Favorite Nursery Rhymes, Ethel Franklin Betts; F.A. Stokes Co.
1906 -- The Runaway Boy, James Whitcomb Riley; Bobbs-Merrill Company
1906 -- While the Heart Beats Young, James Whitcomb Riley; Bobbs-Merrill Company.
1907 -- The Raggedy Man, James Whitcomb Riley; Bobbs Merrill Company.
1908 -- The Orphan Annie book, James Whitcomb Riley; Bobbs-Merrill Company
1909 -- Fairy tales from Grimm, Jacob Grimm and Wilhelm Grimm; E. Stern & Co.
1909 -- The Complete Mother Goose with Illustrations in Colors and in Black and White Ethel Franklin Betts

References

External links
 
 
Ethel F. Bains on Findagrave.com

American women illustrators
American illustrators
Artists from Philadelphia
Pennsylvania Academy of the Fine Arts alumni
1877 births
1959 deaths
Drexel University alumni
Burials in Pennsylvania